St. Xavier's College of Education (Autonomous), Patna (SXCE Patna or SXCE), co-educational, self-financed, Catholic minority institution in Patna, Bihar, India. Founded in 1988 by the Patna Province of the Society of Jesus, it is named after St. Francis Xavier, a Spanish Jesuit saint of the 16th century and Catholic missionary to India.

History
The Jesuits first came to Patna in 1919, and in early 1930 were approached to set up a school in the city of Patna. Fr. Loesch with the assistance of Fr. Marshall D. Moran opened a Cambridge school serving the people of Patna and Bihar. Later, in 1940, St. Xavier's High School, Patna, was built at Gandhi Maidan Marg. Then in November 1988 the Jesuits founded St. Xavier’s College of Education, Patna.

Academics
The college offers Ph.D. (Education) and two-years undergraduate and postgraduate programmes in Bachelor of Education and Master of Education from Aryabhatta Knowledge University. St. Xavier’s College of Education is approved by the National Council for Teacher Education (NCTE). The college is also accredited with "A" Grade by the National Assessment and Accreditation Council (NAAC).

Facilities
The campus covers about 10117.5 sq.m. at Digha in Patna. The main building housing offices and classrooms was completed in 1990, and was extended in 2010. The college's main facility includes laboratories for Physical Science, Language, Psychology, Education, Technology, and Biology, as well as multipurpose halls, a library with over 13,000 books, and two computer labs. The college provides boarding facilities and includes a gymnasium and outdoor fields, and also a canteen.

Alumni
St. Xavier's College of Education Alumni Association (SXCEAA), formed in 2003, sponsors many activities. In 2015 the president of the association was Marie Ann D’Cruz.

Sister institutions
The sister institutions of St. Xavier's College in Patna are
St. Xavier's High School, Patna
St. Michael's High School, Patna
St. Xavier's College, Patna

See also
 List of Jesuit sites

References

External links

Educational institutions established in 1988
Universities and colleges in Patna
Jesuit universities and colleges in India
1988 establishments in Bihar
Colleges of education in India
Colleges affiliated to Aryabhatta Knowledge University